Izmaylovsky Park or Izmaylovo Park is one of the largest parks in Moscow, Russia. The park consists of two areas: Izmaylovsky forest and Izmaylovsky Park for recreation. It is situated in the Izmaylovo District in the northeast of the city. The northern border of the park is the tram line alongside the Izmailovskaya station of the Moscow Metro that serves the park, the southern is the Entuziastov Highway.

History of the park
In 1571-1585 the park was a country estate of a Muscovite boyar Zakharyin-Yuriev. After 1585, the ownership was passed to the Romanov family. Since 1663, it became the official countryside residence of tsar Aleksey Mikhailovich. The very same time the construction and redesign of the estate were initiated.

At first, a dam was constructed on Serebryanka river which resulted in formation of several ponds, namely Lebedyansky, Vinogradny and Serebryany. An artificial island was situated in the middle of the Serebryany pond. Later, the official tsar’s palace was built on that island that existed up until 1855. Christmas church was also built on the Serebryany Island in 1676, which became the cathedral in 1679. There were a lot of gardens with exotic plants and trees, cherished under personal supervision of the tsar. The household buildings also included greenhouses, mills, breweries and other facilities. The organization of the household was so efficient that it alone could fully satisfy the needs of the tsar’s court. One of the biggest zoos in Europe at that time could also be found in Izmaylovo manor.

Unfortunately, after the death of Aleksey Mikhailovich the estates were abandoned and a lot of the buildings and facilities fell into decline. When he was a child, Peter the Great used the territory and the gardens for his war games; the remains of the redoubts he built are still partially preserved. He also constructed a Prosyansky (Zhukovski) dam on the Serebryanka river to form a pond, which was later used for the trial sails of the botik “St. Nicholas” that Peter the Great discovered in Izmaylovo.

In 1839, the mansion was used as a hospice and a house for the veterans of the war with Napoleon, as well as a shelter for the widows and a small school for their children. In 19th century a big effort was put into recovery and restoration of the forests and gardens on the territory of the future Izmaylovsky park that continued over the decades.

In 1930, Izmaylovo was given an official status of the park and in 1939 it was renamed after J.V. Stalin. It was one of the best parks in USSR, with a lot of facilities, including a theatre and a cinema. The park’s giant territory allowed for more objects to be installed, thus a pond was to be created in the middle of the park, and a zoo in the eastern part of it. A giant central stadium also named after Stalin was supposed to be the highlight of the park infrastructure and the biggest stadium in the country. The construction, although started, was haltered by the Second World War and never finished.

In 1944, an underground station “Izmaylovsky park” was built to allow good transportation links with the other parts of the city. In 1961 the park was renamed to Izmaylovsky park, falling in line with the general direction of the party against Stalin's cult of personality. The underground station was renamed in 2005 into Partizanskaya.

Available activities
Bavarian curling
Shuffleboard
 two Ferris wheels
children's playground
amusement park and rides
5D cinema
swimming pool
dolphinarium
adventure park"PandaPark"
equipment hiring
skaters area
boat hiring
Also, throughout the year free outdoor classes and courses are free to the public, including general work-out, yoga, dancing and aerobics for children. For children, there is also a small zoo with rabbits, rats, hedgehogs and Guinea pigs.
In winter a skating rink is open.

Izmaylovsky forest

Izmaylovsky forest has a territory of 1608.1 hectares. The forest has a big diversity of plant species, including those that are endangered and are monitored by the Preservation agencies (almost 50 species). Rarely observed in urban areas, the transitional bog of the forest has originated from growing of the sphagnum moss. There are more than 25 species of lichens and 75 species of moss. The major part of the forest consists of deciduous trees, such as linden tree, oak, birch, maple. The Eastern part of the forest is constituted mainly by pines and firs that are more than hundred years old and were planted in the middle of 19th century as a part of the forest restoration effort. In total, more than 500 species are presented within the biological diversity of the forest. Some flowering plants are also preserved: various species of lilies, including Turk's cap lily, orchids, etc. Many species are registered medicinal plants and are listed in the Russian Pharmacopoeia (The State Pharmacopoeia of the Russian Federation), such as bistort Bistorta officinalis.

Interesting facts
In November 1995, Chechen terrorists planted, but did not detonate, a radiological dispersal device (commonly known as a dirty bomb) in Izmailovo Park. The bomb consisted of dynamite and caesium-137 removed from cancer treatment equipment. Reporters were tipped off about its location and it was defused.
There is also a stand-up comedy show in Russian television with the same name (Izmaylovsky Park), starring Russian comedian Lion Izmailov. The name is based on a word play, where Izmaylovsky belongs both to the park (where people get together for recreation) and to the surname of the show host.

References

Parks and gardens in Moscow
Urban forests in Russia